The McDonnell Douglas F/A-18 Hornet is an all-weather, twin-engine, carrier-capable, multirole combat aircraft, designed as both a fighter and attack aircraft (hence the F/A designation). Designed by McDonnell Douglas and Northrop, the F/A-18 was derived from the latter's YF-17 in the 1970s for use by the United States Navy and Marine Corps. The Hornet is also used by the air forces of several other nations, and formerly by the U.S. Navy's Flight Demonstration Squadron, the Blue Angels.

The F/A-18 was designed to be a highly versatile aircraft due to its avionics, cockpit displays, and excellent aerodynamic characteristics, with the ability to carry a wide variety of weapons. The aircraft can perform fighter escort, fleet air defense, suppression of enemy air defenses, air interdiction, close air support, and aerial reconnaissance. Its versatility and reliability have proven it to be a valuable carrier asset, though it has been criticized for its lack of range and payload compared to its earlier contemporaries, such as the Grumman F-14 Tomcat in the fighter and strike fighter role, and the Grumman A-6 Intruder and LTV A-7 Corsair II in the attack role.

The Hornet first saw combat action during the 1986 United States bombing of Libya and subsequently participated in the 1991 Gulf War and 2003 Iraq War. The F/A-18 Hornet served as the baseline for the Boeing F/A-18E/F Super Hornet, its larger, evolutionary redesign, which replaced both the older Hornet and the F-14 Tomcat in the U.S. Navy.

Development

Origins

The U.S. Navy started the Naval Fighter-Attack, Experimental (VFAX) program to procure a multirole aircraft to replace the Douglas A-4 Skyhawk, the A-7 Corsair II, and the remaining McDonnell Douglas F-4 Phantom IIs, and to complement the F-14 Tomcat. Vice Admiral Kent Lee, then head of Naval Air Systems Command, was the lead advocate for the VFAX against strong opposition from many Navy officers, including Vice Admiral William D. Houser, deputy chief of naval operations for air warfare – the highest-ranking naval aviator.

In August 1973, Congress mandated that the Navy pursue a lower-cost alternative to the F-14. Grumman proposed a stripped F-14 designated the F-14X, while McDonnell Douglas proposed a naval variant of the F-15, but both were nearly as expensive as the F-14.  That summer, Secretary of Defense James R. Schlesinger ordered the Navy to evaluate the competitors in the Air Force's Lightweight Fighter (LWF) program, the General Dynamics YF-16 and Northrop YF-17.  The Air Force competition specified a day fighter with no strike capability. In May 1974, the House Armed Services Committee redirected $34 million from the VFAX to a new program, the Navy Air Combat Fighter (NACF), intended to make maximum use of the technology developed for the LWF program.

Redesigning the YF-17
Though the YF-16 won the LWF competition, the Navy was skeptical that an aircraft with one engine and narrow landing gear could be easily or economically adapted to carrier service, and refused to adopt an F-16 derivative. On 2 May 1975, the Navy announced its selection of the YF-17. Since the LWF did not share the design requirements of the VFAX, the Navy asked McDonnell Douglas and Northrop to develop a new aircraft from the design and principles of the YF-17. On 1 March 1977, Secretary of the Navy W. Graham Claytor announced that the F-18 would be named "Hornet".

Northrop had partnered with McDonnell Douglas as a secondary contractor on NACF to capitalize on the latter's experience in building carrier aircraft, including the widely used F-4 Phantom II. On the F-18, the two companies agreed to evenly split component manufacturing, with McDonnell Douglas conducting the final assembly. McDonnell Douglas would build the wings, stabilators, and forward fuselage; while Northrop would build the center and aft fuselage and vertical stabilizers. McDonnell Douglas was the prime contractor for the naval versions, and Northrop would be the prime contractor for the F-18L land-based version which Northrop hoped to sell on the export market.

The F-18, initially known as McDonnell Douglas Model 267, was drastically modified from the YF-17. For carrier operations, the airframe, undercarriage, and tailhook were strengthened, folding wings and catapult attachments were added, and the landing gear was widened. A "snag" was added to the wing's leading edge and stabilators to prevent an aeroelastic flutter discovered in the F-15 stabilator. The YF-17's control system was replaced with a fully digital fly-by-wire system with quadruple redundancy, the first to be installed in a production fighter.

Originally, plans were to acquire a total of 780 aircraft of three variants: the single-seat F-18A fighter and A-18A attack aircraft, differing only in avionics, and the dual-seat TF-18A, which retained full mission capability of the F-18 with a reduced fuel load. Following improvements in avionics and multifunction displays, and a redesign of external stores stations, the A-18A and F-18A were able to be combined into one aircraft. Starting in 1980, the aircraft began to be referred to as the F/A-18A, and the designation was officially announced on 1 April 1984. The TF-18A was redesignated F/A-18B.

Northrop's F-18L
Northrop developed the F-18L as a potential export aircraft. Since it was not strengthened for carrier service, it was expected to be lighter and better performing, and a strong competitor to the F-16 Fighting Falcon then being offered to American allies. Though the aircraft retained a lightened tailhook, the most obvious external difference was removed "snags" on the leading edge of the wings and stabilators. It still retained 71% commonality with the F/A-18 by parts weight, and 90% of the high-value systems, including the avionics, radar, and electronic countermeasure suite, though alternatives were offered. Unlike the F/A-18, the F-18L carried no fuel in its wings and lacked weapons stations on the intakes. It had three underwing pylons on each side, instead.

The F/A-18L version followed to coincide with the U.S. Navy's F/A-18A as a land-based export alternative. The revised F/A-18L included wing fuel tanks and fuselage stations of the F/A-18A. Compared to the F-18L, the outboard weapons pylons are closer to the wingtip missile rails. Because of the strengthened nonfolding wing, the wingtip missile rails were designed to carry either the AIM-7 Sparrow or Skyflash medium-range air-to-air missiles, in addition to the AIM-9 Sidewinder as found on the F/A-18A. The F/A-18L was strengthened for a 9 g design load factor compared to the F/A-18A's 7.5 g factor.

The partnership between McDonnell Douglas and Northrop soured over competition for foreign sales for the two models. Northrop felt that McDonnell Douglas would put the F/A-18 in direct competition with the F-18L. In October 1979, Northrop filed a series of lawsuits charging that McDonnell was using Northrop technology developed for the F-18L for foreign sales of the F/A-18 in violation of their agreement, and asked for a moratorium on foreign sales of the Hornet.  McDonnell Douglas countersued, alleging Northrop illegally used F/A-18 technology in its F-20 Tigershark. A settlement was announced 8 April 1985 for all of the lawsuits. McDonnell Douglas paid Northrop $50 million for "rights to sell the F/A-18 wherever it could". Additionally, the companies agreed on McDonnell Douglas as the prime contractor with Northrop as the principal subcontractor. As principal subcontractor, Northrop will produce the rear section for the F/A-18 (A/B/C/D/E/F), while McDonnell Douglas will produce the rest with final assembly to be performed by McDonnell Douglas. At the time of the settlement, Northrop had ceased work on the F-18L. Most export orders for the F-18L were captured by the F-16 or the F/A-18. The F-20 Tigershark did not enter production, and although the program was not officially terminated until 17 November 1986, it was dead by mid-1985.

Into production

During flight testing, the snag on the leading edge of the stabilators was filled in, and the gap between the leading-edge extensions (LEX) and the fuselage was mostly filled in. The gaps, called the boundary layer air discharge slots, controlled the vortices generated by the LEX and presented clean air to the vertical stabilizers at high angles of attack, but they also generated a great deal of parasitic drag, worsening the problem of the F/A-18's inadequate range. McDonnell filled in 80% of the gap, leaving a small slot to bleed air from the engine intake. This may have contributed to early problems with fatigue cracks appearing on the vertical stabilizers due to extreme structural loads, resulting in a short grounding in 1984 until the stabilizers were strengthened. Starting in May 1988, a small vertical fence was added to the top of each LEX to broaden the vortices and direct them away from the vertical stabilizers. This also provided a minor increase in controllability as a side effect. F/A-18s of early versions had a problem with insufficient rate of roll, exacerbated by the insufficient wing stiffness, especially with heavy underwing ordnance loads. The first production F/A-18A flew on 12 April 1980. After a production run of 380 F/A-18As (including the nine assigned to flight systems development), manufacture shifted to the F/A-18C in September 1987.

Improvements and design changes
In the 1990s, the U.S. Navy faced the need to replace its aging A-6 Intruders and A-7 Corsair IIs with no replacement in development. To answer this deficiency, the Navy commissioned development of the F/A-18E/F Super Hornet. Despite its designation, it is not just an upgrade of the F/A-18 Hornet, but rather, a new, larger airframe using the design concepts of the Hornet. Hornets and Super Hornets will serve complementary roles in the U.S. Navy carrier fleet until the Hornet A-D models are completely replaced by the F-35C Lightning II.  The Marines have chosen to extend the use of certain F/A-18s up to 10,000 flight hours, due to delays in the F-35B variant.

Design

The F/A-18 is a twin engine, midwing, multimission tactical aircraft. It is highly maneuverable, due to its good thrust-to-weight ratio, digital fly-by-wire control system, and leading-edge extensions, which allow the Hornet to remain controllable at high angles of attack. The trapezoidal wing has a 20-degree sweepback on the leading edge and a straight trailing edge. The wing has full-span, leading-edge flaps and the trailing edge has single-slotted flaps and ailerons over the entire span.

Canted vertical stabilizers are another distinguishing design element, one among several other such elements that enable the Hornet's excellent high angle of attack ability, including oversized horizontal stabilators, oversized trailing-edge flaps that operate as flaperons, large full-length leading-edge slats, and flight control computer programming that multiplies the movement of each control surface at low speeds and moves the vertical rudders inboard instead of simply left and right. The Hornet's normally high angle of attack performance envelope was put to rigorous testing and enhanced in the NASA F-18 High Alpha Research Vehicle (HARV). NASA used the F-18 HARV to demonstrate flight handling characteristics at high angle-of-attack (alpha) of 65–70 degrees using thrust vectoring vanes. F/A-18 stabilators were also used as canards on NASA's F-15S/MTD.

The Hornet was among the first aircraft to heavily use multifunction displays, which at the switch of a button allow a pilot to perform either fighter or attack roles or both. This "force multiplier" ability gives the operational commander more flexibility to employ tactical aircraft in a fast-changing battle scenario. It was the first Navy aircraft to incorporate a digital multiplexing avionics bus, enabling easy upgrades.

The Hornet was designed to reduce maintenance, and as a result, has required far less downtime than its heavier counterparts, the F-14 Tomcat and the A-6 Intruder. Its mean time between failures is three times greater than any other Navy strike aircraft, and requires half the maintenance time.  Its General Electric F404 engines were also innovative in that they were designed with operability, reliability, and maintainability first. The engine, while unexceptional in rated performance, demonstrates exceptional robustness under various conditions and is resistant to stall and flameout.  The F404 engine connects to the airframe at only 10 points and can be replaced without special equipment: a four-person team can remove the engine within 20 minutes. The aircraft has a top speed of Mach 1.8 at 40,000 ft.

The engine air inlets of the Hornet, like that of the F-16, are of a simpler "fixed" design, while those of the F-4, F-14, and F-15 have variable geometry or variable intake ramp air inlets.

A 1989 USMC study found that single-seat fighters were well suited to air-to-air combat missions, while dual-seat fighters were favored for complex strike missions against heavy air and ground defenses in adverse weather—the question being not so much as to whether a second pair of eyes would be useful, but as to having the second crewman sit in the same fighter or in a second fighter. Single-seat fighters that lacked wingmen were shown to be especially vulnerable.

Operational history

United States

Entry into service

McDonnell Douglas rolled out the first F/A-18A on 13 September 1978, in blue-on-white colors marked with "Navy" on the left and "Marines" on the right. Its first flight was on 18 November. In a break with tradition, the Navy pioneered the "principal site concept" with the F/A-18, where almost all testing was done at Naval Air Station Patuxent River, instead of near the site of manufacture, and using Navy and Marine Corps test pilots instead of civilians early in development. In March 1979, Lt. Cdr. John Padgett became the first Navy pilot to fly the F/A-18.

Following trials and operational testing by VX-4 and VX-5, Hornets began to fill the Fleet Replacement Squadrons VFA-125, VFA-106, and VMFAT-101, where pilots are introduced to the F/A-18. The Hornet entered operational service with Marine Corps squadron VMFA-314 at MCAS El Toro on 7 January 1983, and with Navy squadron VFA-25 on 1 July 1984, replacing F-4s and A-7Es, respectively.

Navy strike-fighter squadrons VFA-25 and VFA-113 (assigned to CVW-14) deployed aboard  from February to August 1985, marking the first deployment for the F/A-18.

The initial fleet reports were complimentary, indicating that the Hornet was extraordinarily reliable, a major change from its predecessor, the F-4J.   In January 1985, the VFA-131 "Wildcats" and the VFA-132 "Privateers" moved from Naval Air Station Lemoore, California to Naval Air Station Cecil Field, Florida to become the Atlantic Fleet's first F/A-18 squadrons. VFA-151, VFA-161, VFA-192 and VFA-195 transitioned to the F/A-18A in 1986. With the exception of VFA-161, the rest would move to NAF Atsugi, Japan to join CVW-5 and the USS Midway. Other squadrons that switched to F/A-18 included VFA-146 "Blue Diamonds", and VFA-147 "Argonauts".

The U.S. Navy's Blue Angels Flight Demonstration Squadron switched to the F/A-18 Hornet in 1986, replacing the A-4 Skyhawk. The Blue Angels performed in F/A-18A, B, C, and D models at air shows and other special events across the US and worldwide before transitioning to the F/A-18E/F Super Hornet in late 2020. Blue Angels pilots must have 1,400 hours and an aircraft-carrier certification. The two-seat B and D models were typically used to give rides to VIPs, but also filled in for other aircraft, if such a need arose.

NASA operates several F/A-18 aircraft for research purposes and also as chase aircraft; these F/A-18s are based at the Armstrong Flight Research Center (formerly the Dryden Flight Research Center) in California. NASA received three two-seat F/A-18B aircraft in 2018.  On 21 September 2012, two NASA F/A-18s escorted a NASA Boeing 747 Shuttle Carrier Aircraft carrying the Space Shuttle Endeavour over portions of California to Los Angeles International Airport before being delivered to the California Science Center museum in Los Angeles.

Combat operations
The F/A-18 first saw combat action in April 1986, when VFA-131, VFA-132, VMFA-314, and VMFA-323 Hornets from  flew Suppression of Enemy Air Defense (SEAD) missions against Libyan air defenses during Operation Prairie Fire and an attack on Benghazi as part of Operation El Dorado Canyon.

During the Gulf War of 1991, the Navy deployed 106 F/A-18A/C Hornets and Marine Corps deployed 84 F/A-18A/C/D Hornets. F/A-18 pilots were credited with two kills during the Gulf War, both MiG-21s. While en route, they were warned by an E-2C of approaching "Bandits" or Iraqi MiG-21 aircraft. The Hornets shot down the two MiGs with AIM-7 and AIM-9 missiles in a brief dogfight. It took 40 seconds from when the bandits appeared on the radar of the E-2 until both aircraft were shot down. The F/A-18s, each carrying four  bombs, then resumed their bombing run before returning to Saratoga.

The Hornet's survivability was demonstrated when a Hornet took hits in both engines and flew  back to base. It was repaired and flying within a few days. F/A-18s flew 4,551 sorties with 10 Hornets damaged including three losses, one confirmed lost to enemy fire.  All three losses were U.S. Navy F/A-18s, with two of their pilots lost. On 17 January 1991, Lieutenant Commander Scott Speicher of VFA-81 was shot down and killed in the crash of his aircraft. An unclassified summary of a 2001 CIA report suggests that Speicher's aircraft was shot down by a missile fired from an Iraqi Air Force aircraft, most likely a MiG-25.

On 5 February 1991, F/A-18A bureau number 163096, piloted by Lieutenant Robert Dwyer was lost over the North Persian Gulf after a successful mission to Iraq; he was officially listed as killed in action, body not recovered.

As the A-6 Intruder was retired in the 1990s, its role was filled by the F/A-18. The F/A-18 demonstrated its versatility and reliability during Operation Desert Storm, shooting down enemy fighters and subsequently bombing enemy targets with the same aircraft on the same mission. It broke records for tactical aircraft in availability, reliability, and maintainability.

Both U.S. Navy F/A-18A/C models and Marine F/A-18A/C/D models were used continuously in Operation Southern Watch and over Bosnia and Kosovo in the 1990s. U.S. Navy Hornets flew during Operation Enduring Freedom in 2001 from carriers operating in the North Arabian Sea. Both the F/A-18A/C and newer F/A-18E/F variants were used during Operation Iraqi Freedom in 2003, operating from aircraft carriers as well from an air base in Kuwait. Later in the conflict USMC A+, C, and primarily D models operated from bases within Iraq.

An F/A-18C was accidentally downed in a friendly fire incident by a Patriot missile when a pilot tried to evade two missiles fired at his plane and crashed. Two others collided over Iraq in May 2005.

As of 2017, the USMC plans to use the F/A-18 until the early 2030s.

The aircraft briefly went back to sea for routine carrier qualifications in October, but it was retired from active Navy service on 1 February 2019. The type continued to be used by reserve units, primarily for adversary training. The actual final Navy F/A-18C operational flight occurred on 2 October 2019.

Non-U.S. service
The F/A-18 has been purchased and is in operation with several foreign air services. Export Hornets are typically similar to U.S. models of a similar manufacture date. Since none of the customers operate aircraft carriers, all export models have been sold without the automatic carrier landing system, and the Royal Australian Air Force further removed the catapult attachment on the nose gear.  Except for Canada, all export customers purchased their Hornets through the U.S. Navy, via the U.S. Foreign Military Sales program, where the Navy acts as the purchasing manager, but incurs no financial gain or loss. Canada is the largest Hornet operator outside of the U.S.

Australia

The Royal Australian Air Force purchased 57 F/A-18A fighters and 18 F/A-18B two-seat trainers to replace its Dassault Mirage IIIOs. Numerous options were considered for the replacement, notably the F-15A Eagle, the F-16 Fighting Falcon, and the then new F/A-18 Hornet. The F-15 was discounted because the version offered had no ground-attack capability. The F-16 was considered unsuitable largely due to having only one engine. Australia selected the F/A-18 in October 1981.  Original differences between the Australian and U.S. Navy's standard F/A-18 were the removed nose-wheel tie bar for catapult launch (later re-fitted with a dummy version to remove nose wheel shimmy), addition of a high frequency radio, an Australian fatigue data analysis system, an improved video and voice recorder, and the use of instrument landing system/VHF omnidirectional range instead of the carrier landing system.

The first two aircraft were produced in the US, with the remainder assembled in Australia at Government Aircraft Factories. F/A-18 deliveries to the RAAF began on 29 October 1984, and continued until May 1990.  In 2001, Australia deployed four aircraft to Diego Garcia, in an air-defense role, during coalition operations against the Taliban in Afghanistan. In 2003, 75 Squadron deployed 14 F/A-18s to Qatar as part of Operation Falconer and these aircraft saw action during the invasion of Iraq.  Australia had 71 Hornets in service in 2006, after four were lost to crashes.

The fleet was upgraded beginning in the late 1990s to extend their service lives to 2015. They were expected to be retired then and replaced by the F-35 Lightning II. Several of the Australian Hornets have had refits applied to extend their service lives until the planned retirement date of 2020. Australia has also purchased 24 F/A-18F Super Hornets, with deliveries beginning in 2010.

In March 2015, six F/A-18As from No. 75 Squadron were deployed to the Middle East as part of Operation Okra, replacing a detachment of Super Hornets.

Australia has sold 25 F/A-18A/Bs to Canada with first two delivered to RCAF in February 2019. By 2021, 12 (A)F/A-18A and 6 (A)F/A-18B (and an additional 7 disassembled (A)F/A-18 for spare parts) were sold to the RCAF.

At Wings Over Illawarra 2021, the Hornet performed its last public flying display before retirement. Australia formally retired the Hornet at RAAF Base Williamtown on 29 November 2021. On 30 November 2021, No. 75 Squadron RAAF flew 7 of the last Hornets from RAAF Base Tindal to RAAF Base Williamtown. On 3 December 2021, the last Hornet left RAAF Base Tindal for decommissioning. Due to inclement weather, the Hornet diverted to RAAF Base Townsville and concluded the final RAAF Hornet flight to RAAF Base Williamtown on 4 December 2021.

Canada

Canada was the first export customer for the Hornet, replacing the Canadair CF-104 Starfighter (air reconnaissance and strike), the McDonnell CF-101 Voodoo (air interception) and the Canadair CF-116 Freedom Fighter (ground attack). The Canadian Forces Air Command ordered 98 A models (Canadian designation CF-188A/CF-18A) and 40 B models (designation CF-188B/CF-18B).  The original CF-18 as delivered was nearly identical to the F/A-18A and B models. Many features that made the F/A-18 suitable for naval carrier operations were retained by the Canadian Forces, such as the robust landing gear, the arrestor hook, and wing folding mechanisms.

In 1991, Canada committed 26 CF-18s to the Gulf War, based in Qatar. These aircraft primarily provided Combat Air Patrol duties, although, late in the air war, began to perform air strikes on Iraqi ground targets. On 30 January 1991, two CF-18s on CAP detected and attacked an Iraqi TNC-45 patrol boat. The vessel was repeatedly strafed and damaged by 20mm cannon fire, but an attempt to sink the ship with an air-to-air missile failed. The ship was subsequently sunk by American aircraft, but the Canadian CF-18s received partial credit for its destruction.

In June 1999, 18 CF-18s were deployed to Aviano AB, Italy, where they participated in both the air-to-ground and air-to-air roles in the former Yugoslavia.

62 CF-18A and 18 CF-18B aircraft took part in the Incremental Modernization Project which was completed in two phases. The program was launched in 2001 and the last updated aircraft was delivered in March 2010. The aims were to improve air-to-air and air-to-ground combat abilities, upgrade sensors and the defensive suite, and replace the datalinks and communications systems on board the CF-18 from the F/A-18A and F/A-18B standard to the current F/A-18C and F/A-18D standard.

In July 2010 the Canadian government announced plans to replace the remaining CF-18 fleet with 65 F-35 Lightning IIs, with deliveries scheduled to start in 2016. In November 2016, Canada announced plans to buy 18 Super Hornets as an interim solution while reviewing its F-35 order. The plan for Super Hornets was later, in October 2017, put on hold due to a trade conflict with the United States over the Bombardier C-Series. Instead, Canada was seeking to purchase surplus Hornets from Australia or Kuwait.  Canada has since acquired 25 ex-Australian F/A-18A/Bs, the first two of which were delivered in February 2019.  18 of these airframes will be introduced into active service with the remaining 7 to be used for spare parts and testing.

Finland

The Finnish Air Force ordered 64 F-18C/Ds (57 C models, seven D models) in 1992. All F-18D were built at St. Louis, and then all F-18C were assembled in Finland. Delivery of the aircraft started in November 1995 and ended in August 2000. The Hornet replaced the MiG-21bis and Saab 35 Draken in Finnish service. The Finnish Hornets were initially to be used only for air defense, hence the F-18 designation. The F-18C includes the ASPJ (Airborne Self-Protection Jammer) jamming pod ALQ-165.  The U.S. Navy later included the ALQ-165 on their F/A-18E/F Super Hornet procurement.

One Hornet was destroyed in a mid-air collision in 2001. A damaged F-18C, nicknamed "Frankenhornet", was rebuilt into a F-18D using the forward section of a Canadian CF-18B that was purchased. The modified fighter crashed during a test flight in January 2010, due to a faulty tailplane servo cylinder.

The Finnish Air Force's Hornet fleet went through a two-stage Mid-Life Upgrade (MLU) program. From 2006 to 2010, the MLU 1 stage was aimed at improving the aircraft's air-to-air capabilities. It included the integration of the new AIM-9X Sidewinder missile together with the JHMCS helmet-mounted sight, new radios, a new IFF interrogator, and a new moving map display. Then, from 2012 to 2016, the MLU 2 stage was mainly focused at enabling the aircraft to use standoff air-to-ground weapons, including the JDAM, JSOW and JASSM. The Hornets also received the Litening targeting pod. New chaff/flare dispensers were installed. The cockpit was modernized, and Link 16 was added. The upgrade also includes the procurement and integration of a new version of the AIM-120 AMRAAM air-to-air missile. In total, 62 aircraft (the whole Finnish Hornet fleet as of 2016) were modernized to MLU 2 standards.

With a service life of 30 years, the Hornets are to remain in active service until 2025–2030. In October 2014, the Finnish national broadcaster Yle announced that consideration was being given to the replacement of the Hornet. In 2015, Finland started the HX Fighter Program that aims to acquire new multirole fighters to replace the current Hornet fleet. On 10 December 2021, the Finnish government announced the selection of Lockheed Martin's fifth-generation F-35A Lightning II for its HX Fighter Program.

Kuwait

The Kuwait Air Force (Al Quwwat Aj Jawwaiya Al Kuwaitiya) ordered 32 F/A-18C and eight F/A-18D Hornets in 1988. Delivery started in October 1991 until August 1993.  The F/A-18C/Ds replaced A-4KU Skyhawk. Kuwait Air Force Hornets have flown missions over Iraq during Operation Southern Watch in the 1990s. They have also participated in military exercises with the air forces of other Gulf nations.  Kuwait had 39 F/A-18C/D Hornets in service in 2008.  Kuwait also participated in the Yemeni Civil War (2015–present). In February 2017, the Commander of the Kuwait Air Force revealed that the F/A-18s based at King Khalid Air Base had performed approximately 3,000 sorties over Yemen.

Malaysia

The Royal Malaysian Air Force (Tentera Udara Diraja Malaysia) has eight F/A-18Ds. Delivery of the aircraft spanned from March 1997 to August 1997.

Three Hornets together with five UK-made BAE Hawk 208 were deployed in a bombing airstrike on the "Royal Security Forces of the Sultanate of Sulu and North Borneo" terrorists on 5 March 2013, just before the joint forces of the Malaysian Army and Royal Malaysia Police commandos launched an all-out assault during Operation Daulat. The Hornets were tasked with close air support to the no-fly zone in Lahad Datu, Sabah.

Spain

The Spanish Air and Space Force (Ejército del Aire y del Espacio) ordered 60 EF-18A model and 12 EF-18B model Hornets (the "E" standing for "España", Spain), named respectively as C.15 and CE.15 by Spain.  The Spanish version was delivered from 22 November 1985 to July 1990. These fighters were upgraded to F-18A+/B+ standard, close to F/A-18C/D (plus version includes later mission and armament computers, databuses, data-storage set, new wiring, pylon modifications and software, new abilities as AN/AAS-38B NITE Hawk targeting FLIR pods).

In 1995 Spain obtained 24 ex-USN F/A-18A Hornets, with six more on option. These were delivered from December 1995 until December 1998. Before delivery, they were modified to EF-18A+ standard. This was the first sale of USN surplus Hornets.

Spanish Hornets operate as an all-weather interceptor 60% of the time and as an all-weather day/night attack aircraft for the remainder. In case of war, each of the front-line squadrons would take a primary role: 121 is tasked with tactical air support and maritime operations; 151 and 122 are assigned to all-weather interception and air combat roles; and 152 is assigned the SEAD mission. Air refueling is provided by KC-130Hs and Boeing 707TTs. Pilot conversion to EF-18 is centralized in 153 Squadron (Ala 15). Squadron 462's role is air defense of the Canary Islands, being responsible for fighter and attack missions from Gando AB.

Spanish Air Force EF-18 Hornets have flown Ground Attack, SEAD, combat air patrol (CAP) combat missions in Bosnia and Kosovo, under NATO command, in Aviano detachment (Italy). They shared the base with Canadian and USMC F/A-18s. Six Spanish Hornets had been lost in accidents by 2003.

Over Yugoslavia, eight EF-18s, based at Aviano AB, participated in bombing raids in Operation Allied Force in 1999, being among the first planes to strike Yugoslav targets. Over Bosnia, they also performed missions for air-to-air combat air patrol, close air support air-to-ground, photo reconnaissance, forward air controller-airborne, and tactical air controller-airborne. Over Libya, four Spanish Hornets participated in enforcing a no-fly zone.

Switzerland

The Swiss Air Force purchased 26 C models and eight D models.  Aircraft were delivered from January 1996 to December 1999.  Three D models and one C model had been lost in crashes as of 2016.  On 14 October 2015, an F/A-18D crashed in France during training with two Swiss Air Force Northrop F-5s in the Swiss/French training area EURAC25; the pilot ejected safely.

In late 2007, Switzerland requested to be included in the F/A-18C/D Upgrade 25 Program, to extend the useful life of its F/A-18C/Ds. The program includes significant upgrades to the avionics and mission computer, 12 ATFLIR surveillance and targeting pods, and 44 sets of AN/ALR-67v3 ECM equipment. In October 2008, the Swiss Hornet fleet reached the 50,000 flight hour milestone.

The Swiss Air Force has also taken delivery of two F/A-18C full-scale mock-ups for use as ground crew interactive training simulators. Locally built by Hugo Wolf AG, they are externally accurate copies and have been registered as Boeing F/A-18C (Hugo Wolf) aircraft with tail numbers X-5098 and X-5099. These include a complex equipment fit, including many original cockpit components and instruments, allowing the simulation of fires, fuel leaks, nosewheel collapse and other emergency scenarios. X-5098 is permanently stationed at Payerne Air Base while X-5099, the first one built, is moved between air bases according to training demands.

Air USA
Air USA, a provider of training services to various U.S. government agencies, has signed a deal to acquire Australia's remaining F/A-18A/B Hornets, after 25 of these were sold to Canada. Air USA is slated to receive 46 Hornets, with 36 in flyable condition and is planning to restore the remaining 10 to airworthiness as well. The Hornets will be used as testers and aggressor jets to train pilots.

Potential operators
The F/A-18C and F/A-18D were considered by the French Navy (Marine Nationale) during the 1980s for deployment on their aircraft carriers Clemenceau and Foch and again in the 1990s for the later nuclear-powered Charles de Gaulle, in the event that the Dassault Rafale M was not brought into service when originally planned.

Austria, Chile, Czech Republic, Hungary, Philippines, Poland, Singapore and Turkey evaluated the Hornet but did not purchase it. Thailand ordered four C and four D model Hornets but the Asian financial crisis in the late 1990s resulted in the order being canceled. The Hornets were completed as F/A-18Ds for the U.S. Marine Corps.

The F/A-18A and F-18L land-based version competed for a fighter contract from Greece in the 1980s.  The Greek government chose F-16 and Mirage 2000 instead.

Variants

F/A-18A/B Hornet

The F/A-18A, single-seat variant, can employ the AGM-84 Harpoon, AGM-65E Maverick, AGM-88 HARM and the AGM-62 Walleye I/II.  The F/A-18A was also equipped with the AN/AAS-38 Nite Hawk targeting pod and the AN/ASQ-173 laser spot tracker for targeting. During the Gulf War, there were limited numbers of the Nite hawk for USN and USMC Hornets. The F/A-18B has space for the two-seat cockpit, provided by a relocation of avionics equipment and a 6% reduction in internal fuel.  Two-seat Hornets are otherwise fully combat-capable. The B-model is used primarily for training.

In 1992, the original Hughes AN/APG-65 radar was replaced with the Hughes (now Raytheon) AN/APG-73, a faster and more capable radar.  A-model Hornets that have been upgraded to the AN/APG-73 and are capable of carrying the AIM-120 AMRAAM are designated F/A-18A+.

F/A-18C/D Hornet 

The F/A-18C is the single-seat variant and the F/A-18D is the two-seat variant. The D-model can be configured for training or as an all-weather strike craft. The "missionized" D model's rear seat is configured for a Marine Corps Naval Flight Officer who functions as a Weapons and Sensors Officer to assist in operating the weapons systems. The F/A-18D is primarily operated by the U.S. Marine Corps in the night attack and Forward Air Controller (Airborne) (FAC(A)) roles.

The F/A-18C and D models are the result of a block upgrade in 1987 incorporating upgraded radar, avionics, and the capacity to carry new missiles such as the AIM-120 AMRAAM air-to-air missile and later on the AGM-84E SLAM as well as the IR version of the AGM-65 (AGM-65F). Other upgrades include the Martin-Baker NACES (Navy Aircrew Common ejection seat), and a self-protection jammer. A synthetic aperture ground mapping radar enables the pilot to locate targets in poor visibility conditions. C and D models delivered since 1989 also have improved night attack abilities, consisting of the Hughes AN/AAR-50 thermal navigation pod, AN/AAS-38A NITE Hawk FLIR (forward looking infrared array) targeting pod, night vision goggles, and two full-color (formerly monochrome) multi-function display (MFDs) and a color moving map.

Sixty D-model Hornets are configured as the night attack F/A-18D (RC) with ability for reconnaissance.  These could be outfitted with the ATARS electro-optical sensor package that includes a sensor pod and equipment mounted in the place of the M61 cannon.

Beginning in 1992, the F404-GE-402 enhanced performance engine, providing approximately 10% more maximum static thrust became the standard Hornet engine.  Since 1993, the AAS-38A NITE Hawk added a designator/ranger laser, allowing it to self-mark targets. The later AAS-38B added the ability to strike targets designated by lasers from other aircraft.

Production of the C- and D- models ended in 2000. The last F/A-18C was assembled in Finland and delivered to the Finnish Air Force in August 2000. The last F/A-18D was delivered to the U.S. Marine Corps in August 2000.

The U.S. Navy retired its F/A-18C/D in February 2019. However, USMC still retains theirs, and is in the process of upgrading their radar to APG-79(V)4 Active Electronically Scanned Array (AESA) radar system.

E/F Super Hornet

The single-seat F/A-18E and two-seat F/A-18F, both officially named Super Hornet, carry over the name and design concept of the original F/A-18 but have been extensively redesigned by McDonnell Douglas. The Super Hornet has a new, 25% larger airframe, larger rectangular air intakes, more powerful GE F414 engines based on F/A-18's F404, and an upgraded avionics suite. Like the Marine Corps' F/A-18D, the Navy's F/A-18F carries a naval flight officer as a second crew member in a weapon systems officer (WSO) role.  The Super Hornet is unofficially known as "Rhino" in operational use. This name was chosen to distinguish the newer variants from the legacy F-18A/B/C/D Hornet and avoid confusion during carrier deck operations.  The Super Hornet is also operated by Australia.

G Growler

The EA-18G Growler is an electronic warfare version of the two-seat F/A-18F, which entered production in 2007. The Growler has replaced the Navy's EA-6B Prowler and carries a Naval Flight Officer as a second crewman in an Electronic Warfare Officer (EWO) role.

US variants list
F/A-18A Original single-seat version, can carry the AGM-84 ASM, AGM-62 Walleye, AGM-88 HARM and the TV guided versions AGM-65 Maverick.
F/A-18B Two-seat version of the F/A-18A, combat capable but mainly used for training.
F/A-18C Improved version of the F/A-18A, can carry the AIM-120 AMRAAM, AGM-84E SLAM and the IR guided versions AGM-65 Maverick.
F/A-18D Two-seat version of the F/A-18C, used only by USMC.
F-18(R) This was a proposed reconnaissance version of the F/A-18A. It included a sensor package that replaced the 20 mm cannon. The first of two prototypes flew in August 1984. Small numbers were produced.
RF-18D Proposed two-seat reconnaissance version for the U.S. Marine Corps in the mid-1980s. It was to carry a radar reconnaissance pod. The system was canceled after it was unfunded in 1988. This ability was later realized on the F/A-18D(RC).
TF-18A Two-seat training version of the F/A-18A fighter, later redesignated F/A-18B.

F-18 HARV Single-seat High Alpha Research Vehicle for NASA. High angles of attack using thrust vectoring, modifications to the flight controls, and forebody strakes

X-53 Active Aeroelastic Wing A NASA F/A-18 has been modified to demonstrate the Active Aeroelastic Wing technology, and was designated X-53 in December 2006.

Export variants
These designations are not part of 1962 United States Tri-Service aircraft designation system.

F-18L A proposed land-based export version of the single-seat F-18A with air-superiority and attack capabilities. This variant was to be lightened by the removal of carrier landing capability and assembled by Northrop.  Customers preferred the standard Hornet and the F-18L never entered mass production.

(A)F/A-18A/B
 (A)F/A-18A: Single-seat fighter/attack version for the Royal Australian Air Force.
 (A)F/A-18B: Two-seat training version for the Royal Australian Air Force.
"F/A-18A" was the original company designation, designations of "AF-18A" & "ATF-18A" have also been applied. Assembled in Australia (excluding the first two (A)F/A-18Bs) by Aero-Space Technologies of Australia (ASTA) from 1985 through to 1990, from kits produced by McDonnell Douglas with increasing local content in the later aircraft. Originally the most notable differences between an Australian (A)F/A-18A/B and a US F/A-18A/B were the lack of a catapult attachment, replacing the carrier tailhook with a lighter land arresting hook, and the automatic carrier landing system with an Instrument Landing System. Australian Hornets have been involved in several major upgrade programs. This program called HUG (Hornet Upgrade) has had a few evolutions over the years. The first was to give Australian Hornets F/A-18C model avionics. The second and current upgrade program (HUG 2.2) updates the fleet's avionics even further. By 2021 12 (A)F/A-18A and 6 (A)F/A-18B (and an additional 7 broken down (A)F/A-18 for spare parts) were sold to the Royal Canadian Air Force.

CF-188
 CF-188A: Single-seat fighter/attack version for the Canadian Armed Forces (CAF)/Royal Canadian Air Force (RCAF). Unofficially referred to as the CF-18A Hornet.
 CF-188B: Two-seat training and combat version for the CAF/RCAF. Unofficially referred to as the CF-18B Hornet.

EF-18 Hornet
 EF-18A: Single-seat fighter/attack version for the Spanish Air and Space Force, the E is for España (Spain in Spanish). The Spanish Air and Space Force designation is C.15, the C being for Caza (fighter aircraft in Spanish, lit. hunt). They were first upgraded to the EF-18A+ version in 1992, this included pylons, computing and electronic systems in the F/A-18C standard. The Spanish Air and Space Force acquired licenses and locally developed many upgrades to the Operating Flying Program (OFP), i.e. the software that controls the aircraft computers. They were the first hornets in the world capable of using the AGM-65 Maverick air to ground missile, and the first air force to use it against naval targets. From 2004 to 2013 they were locally upgraded by EADS CASA and Indra Sistemas in the Mid-life Upgrade (MLU) program, with better avionics, data buses, TPAC, data presentation (bigger color and touch displays similar to the F/A-18E Super Hornet), navigation, communications (radios), software and ECM suit. The AN/APG-65 radar was upgraded to the V3 version and the aircraft also received the AL-400 Radar Warning Receiver and the ASQ-600 emission detector and were certified to operate with Iris-T, Meteor, GBU-48 and Taurus. This also included a thorough structural and engine revision and overhaul, and a new paint job for a few units. This version is locally known as EF-18MLU/C.15M and is considered superior to the US F/A-18C version.
 EF-18B: Two-seat training version for the Spanish Air and Space Force. The Spanish Air and Space Force designation is CE.15. The E is for Entrenamiento, meaning training in Spanish. They were first upgraded to the EF-18B+ version in 1992.

KAF-18 Hornet
 KAF-18C: Single-seat fighter/attack version for the Kuwait Air Force
 KAF-18D: Two-seat training version for the Kuwait Air Force

F-18C/D Hornet
 The Finnish Air Force uses F/A-18C/D Hornets, with a Finland-specific mid-life update. The first seven Hornets (D models) were produced by McDonnell Douglas.  The 57 single-seat F-18C model units were assembled by Patria in Finland.  These variants were delivered without air-to-ground capability so the letter A was dropped from the name.  They were later upgraded to carry air-to-ground weaponry.

F-18C/D Hornet
 Switzerland uses F-18C/D, later Swiss specific mid-life update. The Swiss F-18s had no ground attack capability originally, until hardware was retrofitted.

Operators

 Royal Australian Air Force (former operator)
 No. 3 Squadron RAAF 1985–2017 (converted to F-35A)
 No. 75 Squadron RAAF 1988-2021 (converted to F-35A)
 No. 77 Squadron RAAF 1985-2020 (converted to F-35A)
 No. 2 Operational Conversion Unit RAAF 1985-2019 (converted to F-35A)
 Aircraft Research and Development Unit

 Royal Canadian Air Force (see McDonnell Douglas CF-18 Hornet)
 86 (63 CF-18A & 23 CF-18B) aircraft in use as of 2021.

 Finnish Air Force - 55 F-18Cs and 7 F-18Ds in use as of 2021.
 Karelian Air Command (No. 31 Squadron)
 Lapland Air Command (No. 11 Squadron)
 Satakunta Air Command (No. 21 Squadron, defunct 6/2014)

 Kuwait Air Force - 31 F/A-18Cs and 8 F/A-18Ds in service  Only 34 (27 F/A-18C & 7 F/A-18D) aircraft remain in use as of 2021.
 9th Fighter and Attack Squadron
 25th Fighter and Attack Squadron

 Royal Malaysian Air Force - 8 F/A-18Ds in operation 2021
 No. 18 Squadron, RMAF Butterworth air base.

 Spanish Air and Space Force - 85 F/A-18A+/B+ in service. Only 84 (72 EF-18M and F/A-18C & 12 EF-18BM) aircraft remain in use as of 2021.
 Ala de Caza 15 (15th Fighter Wing) Zaragoza AB, (151, 152 and 153 Squadrons)
 Ala de Caza 12, Torrejón AB (121 and 122 Squadrons)
 Ala 46, Gando AB (Canary islands), with Squadron 462 operating 20 ex-U.S. Navy F/A-18As. They have not received any important upgrades, unlike the hornets operating from the Spanish mainland.

 Swiss Air Force - 25 F/A-18Cs and 5 F/A-18Ds in service as of 2021.
 Fliegerstaffel 11
 Fliegerstaffel 17
 Fliegerstaffel 18

 United States Navy (former operator)
 VFC-12 1990–present (Naval Air Reserve Force)
 VFA-15 1986–2017 (disestablished)
 VFA-22 1990–2004 (initially converted to F/A-18E Super Hornet, 2004–2007; subsequently converted to F/A-18F Super Hornet, 2007–present)
 VFA-25 1984–2013 (converted to F/A-18E Super Hornet)
 VFA-27 1991–2004 (converted to F/A-18E Super Hornet)
 VFA-34 1996–2019 (converted to F/A-18E Super Hornet)
 VFA-37 1990–2018 (converted to F/A-18E Super Hornet)
 VFA-81 1988–2008 (converted to F/A-18E Super Hornet)
 VFA-82 1987–2005 (disestablished)
 VFA-83 1988–2018 (converted to F/A-18E Super Hornet)
 VFA-86 1987–2012 (converted to F/A-18E Super Hornet)
 VFA-87 1986–2015 (converted to F/A-18E Super Hornet)
 VFA-94 1990–2016 (converted to F/A-18F Super Hornet)
 VFA-97 1991–2015 (converted to F/A-18E Super Hornet)
 VFA-105 1990–2006 (converted to F/A-18E Super Hornet)
 VFA-106 1984–2018 (fleet replacement squadron for USN and USMC; operates F/A-18E/F; legacy F/A-18A/A+/B/C/D Hornets phased out in 2018. Converted to F-35C)
 VFA-113 1984–2016 (converted to F/A-18E Super Hornet)
 VFA-115 1996–2001 (converted to F/A-18E Super Hornet)
 VFA-122 2010-2013 (fleet replacement squadron for F/A-18E/F; legacy F/A-18A/A+/B/C/D Hornets phased out in 2013)
 VFA-125 1980–2010 (disestablished, former fleet replacement squadron for USN and USMC; aircraft transferred to VFA-122 and legacy F/A-18A/A+/B/C/D Hornets phased out in 2013)
 VFA-127 1989–1996 (disestablished)
 VFA-131 1984–2018 (converted to F/A-18E Super Hornet)
 VFA-132 1984–1992 (disestablished)
 VFA-136 1985–2008 (converted to F/A-18E Super Hornet)
 VFA-137 1985–2003 (converted to F/A-18E Super Hornet)
 VFA-146 1989–2015 (converted to F/A-18E Super Hornet)
 VFA-147 1989–2007 (converted to F/A-18E Super Hornet, but currently operating the F-35C Lightning II)
 VFA-151 1986–2013 (converted to F/A-18E Super Hornet)
 VFA-161 1986–1988 (disestablished)
 VFA-192 1986–2014 (converted to F/A-18E Super Hornet)
 VFA-195 1985–2011 (converted to the F/A-18E Super Hornet)
 VFA-201 1999–2007 (Naval Air Reserve Force; disestablished)
 VFA-203 1990–2004 (Naval Air Reserve Force; disestablished)
 VFA-204 1990–present (Naval Air Reserve Force)
 VFA-303 1990–1994 (Naval Air Reserve Force; disestablished)
 VFA-305 1990–1994 (Naval Air Reserve Force; disestablished)
 VX-4 1982-1994 (merged with VX-5 in 1994 to form VX-9)
 VX-5 1983-1994 (merged with VX-4 in 1994 to form VX-9)
 VX-9 1994–2020 (legacy hornets phased out in 2020; currently operate F/A-18E/F and E/A-18G aircraft)
 VX-23
 VX-31
 Naval Strike and Air Warfare Center / Naval Aviation Warfighting Development Center

 United States Marine Corps Aviation 273 F/A-18A/B/C/D Hornets in operation as of 2015
 VMFA-112 1992–present (Marine Air Reserve)
 VMFA-115 1985–present
 VMFA-122 1986–2017 (converted to F-35B)
 VMFA-134 1989–2007 (Marine Corps Reserve; placed in cadre status)
 VMFA-142 1990–2008 (Marine Corps Reserve; placed in cadre status)
 VMFA-212 1988–2008 (disestablished)
 VMFA-232 1989–present
 VMFA-235 1989–1996 (disestablished)
 VMFA-251 1987–2020 (to convert to F-35C)
 VMFA-312 1987–present
 VMFA-314 1982–2019 (converted to F-35C)
 VMFA-321 1991–2004 (Marine Corps Reserve; disestablished)
 VMFA-323 1982–present
 VMFA-333 1987–1992 (disestablished)
 VMFA-451 1987-1997 (re-designated to VMFAT-501 April 2010, converted to F-35B)
 VMFA-531 1984–1992 (disestablished)
 VMFA(AW)-121 1989–2012 (converted to F-35B)
 VMFA(AW)-224 1993–present
 VMFA(AW)-225 1991–2020 (converted to F-35B)
 VMFA(AW)-242 1991-2020 (converted to F-35B)
 VMFA(AW)-332 1993–2007 (disestablished)
 VMFA(AW)-533 1992–present
 VMFAT-101 1987–present (USMC FRS; operates F/A-18A/A+/B/C/D)
 MAWTS-1 1990–present
 NASA's Armstrong Flight Research Center (formerly Dryden Flight Research Center) - 4 F/A-18s in use

Aircraft on display
YF-18A
 160775 – U.S. Naval Museum of Armament & Technology, NAWS China Lake, California. This is the first F/A-18A built in 1978. Aircraft was recently restored in the same livery after being built. Aircraft was moved off base for better public viewing.
 160780 – Virginia Air and Space Center, Hampton, Virginia.
F/A-18A

 161353 – Patuxent River Naval Air Museum, NAS Patuxent River, Lexington Park, Maryland.
 161366 – Naval Air Station Lemoore, California, main gate.
 161367 – Naval Air Systems Command Headquarters Building, NAS Patuxent River, Lexington Park, Maryland.
 161712 – Naval Air Station Joint Reserve Base Fort Worth, Fort Worth, Texas, in VMFA-112 markings.
 161725 – California Science Center museum, Los Angeles, California.
 161726 – In Blue Angels markings, main gate, NAS JRB New Orleans, New Orleans, Louisiana.
 161749 – Flying Leatherneck Aviation Museum, MCAS Miramar, California.
 161941 – In Blue Angels #1 markings, main gate, NAS Jacksonville Heritage Park, Jacksonville, Florida.
 161942 – In Blue Angels #1 markings, USS Lexington Museum, Corpus Christi, Texas. On loan from the National Naval Aviation Museum at NAS Pensacola, Florida.
 161957 – Naval Air Warfare Center Training Systems Division (NAWCTSD), Naval Support Activity Orlando, Florida.  This aircraft was relocated from NAS Atlanta, Georgia, following that installation's BRAC-directed closure.
 161961 – Naval Air Station Pensacola, Florida, main gate in Blue Angels #1 markings.
 161982 – Navy Inventory Control Point Philadelphia (NAVINCP-P), Philadelphia, Pennsylvania.
 161983 – In Blue Angels #5 markings, Navy–Marine Corps Memorial Stadium, Annapolis, Maryland.
 162430 – Palm Springs Air Museum, Palm Springs, California.
 162435 – Patriots Point Naval & Maritime Museum, Mount Pleasant, South Carolina.

 162437 – Texas Air Museum, Slaton, Texas in VMFA-531 markings
 162448 – Naval Air Facility El Centro, California, main gate.
 162454 – NAS Oceana Air Park, Naval Air Station Oceana, Virginia.
 162826 – In Blue Angels #3 markings, Fort Worth Aviation Museum, Fort Worth, Texas.
 162901 – , San Diego Aircraft Carrier Museum, San Diego, California.
 163093 – In Blue Angels #6 markings, Pima Air and Space Museum, Tucson, Arizona
 163119 – Defense Supply Center Richmond, Richmond, Virginia.
 163152 – Flying Leatherneck Aviation Museum, MCAS Miramar, California.
 163157 – MCAS Beaufort, South Carolina.

 Unknown – The Hangar (Lancaster JetHawks stadium), Lancaster, California. Painted as NASA No. 842.
 162436 – on display at the Wings of Freedom Aviation Museum, Horsham, Pennsylvania.
 161521 – In Blue Angels #3 markings. Third Hornet received by Blue Angels (1987). Under restoration and display at Moffett Historical Museum, Moffett Federal Airfield, California.
162411 – In Blue Angel #5 markings with the names Lt. Cmdr. Dick Oliver and Lt. Cmdr. Stuart Powrie.  Oliver died when flying a F-11A in 1966 for the Blues and Powrie passed away in an A-4 Skyhawk. Located at then Hickory Aviation Museum, Hickory, North Carolina.
F/A-18B
 161746 – In Blue Angels #7 markings at Saint Louis Science Center, Saint Louis, Missouri.
 161943 – In Blue Angels #7 markings at Yanks Air Museum, Chino, California.
F/A-18C
 163106 – In Blue Angels #2 markings, Museum of Flight, Seattle, Washington.
 163437 – In front of Headquarters, Naval Air Force Atlantic, Naval Station Norfolk, Norfolk, Virginia.
163439 – In Blue Angel #1 markings at the Smithsonian Air And Space Museum, Washington, DC
163498 – Lee Victory Recreation Park, Smyrna, Tennessee.
F/A-18D
 163486 – MCAS Beaufort (East Side), Beaufort, South Carolina. Painted as VMFA(AW)-533 CO bird, aircraft 01 at the officers' club.

Notable accidents
 On 8 December 2008, an F/A-18D crashed in a populated area of San Diego, while on approach to Marine Corps Air Station Miramar, killing four people on the ground. The pilot ejected safely; there was no weapon systems officer (WSO) on board the aircraft.
 On 6 April 2012, a USN F/A-18D from VFA-106 crashed into apartment buildings in Virginia Beach, Virginia. Both crew members ejected. Seven people were injured including the two pilots, who were taken to the hospital; all survived. The crew performed a last-second fuel dump, and thus may have prevented a large explosion and fire after the crash.
On 2 June 2016, United States Marine Corps Captain Jeff Kuss fatally crashed due to weather and fatigue, during a training exercise to prepare for the Great Tennessee Air Show. Capt. Kuss's jet (Blue Angels No. 6) crashed about two miles from the runway after an attempted "Split S" maneuver.

Specifications (F/A-18C/D)

See also

References

Citations

Sources 
 Books

 Donald, David. Carrier Aviation Air Power Directory. London: AIRtime Publishing Inc., 2001. .
 Drendel, Lou. F/A-18 Hornet in action (Aircraft Number 136). Carrollton, Texas: Squadron/Signal Publications, 1993. .
 Elward, Brad. Boeing F/A-18 Hornet (WarbirdTech, Vol. 31). Specialty Press, 2001. .
 Gunston, Bill. F/A-18 Hornet (Modern Combat Aircraft 22). St. Paul, Minnesota: Motorbooks International, 1985. .
 Jenkins, Dennis R. F/A-18 Hornet: A Navy Success Story. New York: McGraw-Hill, 2000. .
 Miller, Jay. McDonnell Douglas F/A-18 Hornet (Aerofax Minigraph 25). Arlington, Texas: Aerofax Inc., 1988. .
 Peacock, Lindsay. F/A-18 Hornet (Osprey Combat Aircraft Series). London: Osprey Publishing, 1986. .
 Senior, Tim. "F/A-18 Hornet, The AirForces Monthly book". AirForces Monthly, 2003. .
 Spick, Mike. McDonnell Douglas F/A-18 Hornet (Classic Warplanes). London: Salamander Books, 1991. .
 Spick, Mike, ed. "F/A-18 Hornet". The Great Book of Modern Warplanes. St. Paul, Minnesota: MBI, 2000. .
 Vann, Frank. McDonnell Douglas F/A-18 Hornet (How They Work: Jet Fighter). New York: Exeter Books, 1988. .
 Wilson, Stewart. Phantom, Hornet and Skyhawk in Australian Service. Weston Creek, ACT, Australia: Aerospace Publications, 1993. .

 Journal articles

 Holmes, Tony. "RAAF Hornets at War". Australian Aviation. Canberra: Phantom Media, January/February 2006/No. 224. ISSN 0813-0876.
 Yañez, Roberto and Alex Rodriguez. "Spanish Hornets: Providing a Potent Sting". Air International, Volume 75, Number 2, August 2008, pp. 22–25.

External links

 F/A-18 Hornet U.S. Navy fact file  and F/A-18 Hornet Navy history page
 F/A-18A Hornet page and Flying the F/A-18F Super Hornet page on ausairpower.net
 List of all USN/USMC Hornets by Lot/Bureau Number (BuNo) and their known disposition 
 RAAF F/A-18A Hornet fact file
 Swiss Air Force F/A-18C Walkaround

F-18 Hornet
Carrier-based aircraft
F-018 Hornet
1970s United States attack aircraft
1970s United States fighter aircraft
Twinjets
Articles containing video clips
Mid-wing aircraft
Aircraft first flown in 1978
Fourth-generation jet fighter